Ponterosa is a 2001 Finnish comedy film directed by brothers Mika and Pasi Kemmo. The film takes place in a campsite in Åland, where a group of very different people get to know each other.

Cast 

 Tony Halme as Mauri, "Maukka"
 Heikki Paavilainen as Jussi
 Timo Julkunen as Oskari Mäkelä
 Paula Siimes as Stella, Mauri's sister
 Karita Tuomola as Monica
 Jenni Ahola as Nelli
 Laura West as Maria
 Matti Tuominen as Lauri, "Late", Mauri's and Stella's father
 Vesa Vierikko as a urologist
 Jarmo Mäkinen as a Coastal Swede

 Tuija Ernamo as Saara, Oskari's wife
 Santeri Kinnunen as a family man at the campsite
 Esko Nikkari as a rural householder on the ship
 Lasse Karkjärvi as a travel agency clerk
 Mattiesko Hytönen as a real man, Saara's lover
 Olli Haaslahti as a young Mauri
 Tom Lindfors as a lawyer
 Ante Kangas as Rolf
 Tuija Timberbacka as a religious person
 Janne Itämies

Source:

Production 
As Ponterosa was one of the few major Finnish films in 2001 that did not receive any financial support from the Finnish Film Foundation, the production was mainly privately funded by a number of companies. Due to this sponsorship, the film contains product placement.

Parts of Ponterosa were shot in Helsinki, Kirkkonummi, Vantaa, and Åland.

Music 

 "Zulu Stomp" (Big Bertha and The Bulldozers)
 "Wild Thing" (The Troggs)
 "Hurt" (Carly Simon)
 "Huilu portailla" (Aku Lundström)
 "Volare" (Bobby Rydell)
 "Batman Theme" (composed by Neal Hefti)
 "Raindrops Keep Fallin' on My Head" (B. J. Thomas)
 "Set U Free" (K-System)
 "Only You" (The Platters)

 "Cuy Cuy" (Zapata)
 "Lopputekstit teema" (Aku Lundström)
 "Reveille Rock" (Johnny & The Hurricanes)
 "Lollipop" (Ronald and Ruby)
 "Jos jotain yrittää / Harva meistä on rautaa" (Tony Halme)
 "I Love How You Love Me" (The Paris Sisters)
 "Will You Love Me Tomorrow" (The Shirelles)
 "Let It Be Me" (Teukka & Tanja)
 "Social Outcast" (Big Bertha and The Bulldozers)

Source:

Soundtrack album 
The soundtrack album for the film, Soundtrack elokuvasta Ponterosa, was released by Edel Records. The album contains 15 tracks. Subsequently, a music video for the album's bonus track "Leikiten" was also released.

Marketing 
Ponterosa was promoted by the film roles of then well-known celebrities. The presence of Karita Tuomola, a television host and the 1997 Miss Finland, and Tony Halme, a professional boxer and wrestler, were used to gain media attention for the film. The celebrity cast also included Jenni Ahola, who was known as the 1997 Miss Hawaiian Tropic of Finland, the 1997 Miss Internet, an Olvi ad girl and as the CEO of the modeling agency Promodel.

The DVD version of Ponterosa was released on 14 July 2006.

Reception 
Receiving only 2,552 admissions, Ponterosa was also poorly received by the critics. The film was criticized for its poor script and dialogue. The technical implementation, especially cinematography, was described as amateurish. Despite the heavy criticism, Ponterosa has subsequently gained significant camp value, and it has been referred to as "the camp classic of Finnish cinema".

References

External links 
 

2001 comedy films
2001 films
Campsites
Films set in Finland
Films set in Helsinki
Films shot in Finland
Finnish comedy films
2000s Finnish-language films